The 1916–17 Swiss National Ice Hockey Championship was the seventh edition of the national ice hockey championship in Switzerland. HC Bern won the championship by defeating Genève-Servette HC in the final.

First round

Eastern Series 
HC Bern qualified for the final.

Western Series 
Genève-Servette HC qualified for the final.

Final 
 HC Bern - Genève-Servette HC 3:2

External links 
Swiss Ice Hockey Federation – All-time results

National
Swiss National Ice Hockey Championship seasons